Indigenous English, also known as First Nations English, refers to varieties of English used by the Indigenous peoples of Canada.  They are outwardly similar to standard Canadian English from the perspective of a non-Canadian.  However, they differ enough from mainstream Canadian speech that Indigenous peoples (the First Nations, Métis, and Inuit) are often identifiable by their speech to non-Indigenous people. That is primarily the result of the influence of non-English accents derived from Indigenous languages combined with a history of geographical and social isolation, since many Aboriginal people live (or formerly lived) in remote communities, in the North, or on Indian reserves.

Some analyses have concluded that contemporary Indigenous Canadian English may represent the late stages of a decreolization process among peoples who historically spoke more creolized or pidginized forms of English. Since the 1990s, the use of the "non-standard" dialects has been poorly perceived by the non-Aboriginal majority, as evidenced by mockery and discrimination. Some features of the dialects, for example, may have led aboriginal children to be wrongly diagnosed as having a speech impairment or a learning disability. Academics have begun to recommend that Canadian schools accept Indigenous varieties of English as valid English and as a part of Indigenous culture.

Few written works appear in Indigenous English dialects; an exception is Maria Campbell's Stories of the Road Allowance People, a collection of Métis folktales. An example from that work illustrates the type of speech used by Elders in rural Métis communities during her research, but some stories were collected in Cree or other languages and translated into dialectical English by Campbell):

See also 
Australian Aboriginal English
American Indian English

References 

Canadian English
Indigenous culture in Canada